Paul Erich Otto Wilhelm Knuth (20 November 1854 in Greifswald – 30 October 1900 in Kiel) was a 19th-century German botanist and pollination ecologist.

He studied chemistry and natural history at the University of Greifswald and obtained his doctorate degree in 1876. He then took up a career as "high school" (Realschule) teacher, first in Iserlohn in Westphalia and from 1881 in Kiel. Parallel with his teaching duties, he found time to study the flora of Schleswig-Holstein and the North Frisian Islands and meticulous studies of plant-pollinator interactions, which he published in his monumental work Handbuch der Blütenbiologie (Handbook of Flower Biology; from 1898 and continued after his death by Otto Appel and Ernst Loew). From 1891 he suffered from illness. He was granted leave of absence to visit the botanic garden at Buitenzorg in Java, where he stayed for five months and did pollination studies. He returned to Kiel via Japan, California and New York.

External links

 Handbook of flower pollination based upon Hermann Müller's work "The fertilisation of flowers by insects", Clarendon Press, Oxford 1906, JR Ainsworth Davis (tr) German: https://archive.org/details/handbookofflower01knut
 Handbuch der Blütenbiologie unter zugrundelegung von Hermann Müller's werk: “Die Befruchtung der Blumen durch Insekten”, Verlag von Wilhelm Engelmann, Leipzig, 1898.  https://archive.org/details/handbookofflower01knut

References 

University of Greifswald alumni
19th-century German botanists
1854 births
1899 deaths